The 1968 European Women Basketball Championship, commonly called EuroBasket Women 1968, was the 11th regional championship held by FIBA Europe. The competition was held in Italy.  (with 16 years old 7footer Uljana Semjonova) easily won the gold medal and  the silver medal while  won the bronze.

First stage

Group A

Group B

Group C

Second stage

Championship Group

8th to 13th Places Group

Final ranking

External links 
 FIBA Europe profile
 Todor66 profile

1968
1968 in women's basketball
1968 in Italian women's sport
International women's basketball competitions hosted by Italy
July 1968 sports events in Europe
Women
Sports competitions in Messina